On 1 February 2012, a massive riot occurred at Port Said Stadium in Port Said, Egypt, following an Egyptian Premier League football match between Masry and Ahly. Seventy-four people were killed and more than 500 were injured after thousands of Al Masry fans stormed the stadium stands and the pitch following a 3–1 victory by their club and violently attacked Ahly fans using clubs, stones, machetes, knives, bottles, and fireworks, trapping them inside the El Ahly partition of the stadium. Many of the deaths were due to police refusal to open the stadium gates, trapping the Ahly fans inside, leaving some to die, and killing others in a stampede while trying to escape. Civil unrest and severe clashes continued until 11 February, but general strikes ended on 13 February. Riots erupted in Cairo, Alexandria, and Suez. Police fired tear gas at protesters; thus, clashes erupted on the streets due to tear gas battles. Unrest calmed and ended on 13 February.

Seventy-three defendants, including nine police officers and two officials from Port Said's Al-Masry club, were charged in the aftermath of the riots. , 26 defendants were acquitted, including seven police officers and an Al-Masry club official. Of the 47 convicted, 11 were sentenced to death, ten received 15-year prison terms, nine received 10-year sentences, sixteen received 5-year sentences, including two police officers and an Al-Masry club official, and one received a 1-year sentence. The Court of Cassation upheld the sentences on 20 February 2017.

As a result of the massacre, the Egyptian government shut down the domestic league for two years, which affected the Egyptian national team.

Incident
The match kick-off was delayed thirty minutes because Al-Masry fans were on the pitch. During half-time and after each of the three second-half goals for Al-Masry, the club's supporters stormed the pitch, and after the match, thousands of spectators ran onto the playing field. Masry fans threw bottles and fireworks at Ahly players, who fled to their changing rooms under police protection. The Masry fans were armed with stones, and some carried knives.

In the ensuing melees, 74 people were killed. Some were stabbed and clubbed, while others were thrown off the stands or died in a crowd crush as they were trying to escape through a closed stadium gate in the back of the stands. Hisham Sheha, an official in the Egyptian health ministry, said stab wounds, brain hemorrhages, and concussions caused the deaths. Over 500 were injured. At least 47 people were arrested after the clashes, according to Egyptian interior ministry.

Ahly coach Manuel José was kicked and punched by Masry fans while attempting to return to his locker room. He was afterward taken to a police station. José and Mohamed Aboutrika reported that they witnessed Ahly fans die in the Ahly locker room. As an immediate reaction to the disaster, Aboutrika decided to retire from football, along with other Egyptian international football stars Mohamed Barakat and Emad Moteab, while José seriously considered leaving Egypt and retiring from coaching football.

Video footage shows that the police were unable or unwilling to contain the attackers. Eyewitnesses said that the police "did nothing to stop it" and "refused to open the closed gates" to allow the crowds to escape. The bureau chief of the Voice of America in Egypt received reports that police opened the barriers separating the Al-Ahly and Al-Masry supporters. Another witness said that many people were allowed into the stadium without tickets. The New York Times reported that a significant factor in the riots was retaliation on the part of the authorities towards the Ultras Ahlawy, who were actively involved in Tahrir Square during the 2011 Egyptian revolution protests and Supreme Council of the Armed Forces (SCAF) chair Mohamed Hussein Tantawi's rule, as they kept chanting anti-government revolutionary chants in almost all Ahly games in the Egyptian Premier League.

Some of the Al Ahly fans were killed in ambulances that carried them to local hospitals. Al Masry fans armed with knives stopped ambulances on the way to hospitals, opened the ambulance's doors, and stabbed Al Ahly fans to kill them.

Reactions
The BBC reported the Egyptian deputy health minister described it as "the biggest disaster in the country's football history". The Parliament of Egypt called for an emergency session to be held on 2 February 2012 to discuss a response.

A scheduled match between Zamalek and Ismaily was canceled due to the Port Said deaths. Subsequent matches of the 2011–12 Egyptian Premier League were postponed following the disaster. On 10 March 2012, the Egyptian Football Association announced the cancellation of the remainder of the season. A spokesperson for the Egyptian Football Association said the decision was made because there was insufficient time to play the remaining games before the national team was scheduled to compete in the 2012 Olympics and qualifiers for the 2013 Africa Cup of Nations. FIFA President Sepp Blatter issued a statement that read: 

In an interview with British writer Islam Issa, Al-Masry's captain Karim Zekri and his brother, former Masry player Mohamed Zekri, said that the police, army, and ex-regime incited the massacre. They added that there were numerous factors suggesting that it was planned, including the lack of searching and ticket inspection outside the stadium, the floodlights switching off, the welding shut of the away stand's gate, and the arrival of thugs from outside.

José also said that the whole massacre was orchestrated. He said that at the north end of the stadium, there was a banner in English: "We are going to kill you all", a slogan that he thought was directed at the international media and not at the teams. He said that the gates at the south end, where the Al-Ahly fans were located, were locked, and some fans died of asphyxiation. He criticized the police, saying they were sitting down rather than facing the pitch and did nothing to stop the repeated pitch invasions during the match. José considered retiring the team at half-time and said the referee should have canceled the match then. He stated that he saw everyone going towards the Al-Ahly end and saw people falling off the stands. He was taken to a VIP room and tried to return to the locker room, but it was impossible to get there. He reported that four people died in the Al-Ahly locker room. José said he wished to remain at Al-Ahly for a couple more years before retiring, saying he likes living there, loves the club, and is treated very well.

ESPN.com columnist Brent Latham described the riot as being politically motivated:

Alleged political involvement
Following the incident, anti-government political activists accused the ruling Supreme Council of the Armed Forces (SCAF) and remnants of the old regime still in positions of power, asserting that the events were of a "counter-revolutionary" nature. Activists cited a rise in crime levels in the week leading up to the event as evidence that the violence had been organized (in Cairo and Helwan: two bank robberies and the heist of an armored vehicle transporting money. In Sharm el-Sheikh: an armed robbery in a currency exchange led to the murder of a French tourist).

The violence in Port Said took place on the eve of the first anniversary of what later became known as "the battle of the camel", when armed thugs stormed protesters in Tahrir Square on camel-back. This was seen by activists as a last-ditch effort by the ruling party to assert control and spread fear of chaos (Hosni Mubarak, the Egyptian president at the time, having warned, in a televised speech on 1 February 2011, of "chaos" if he was to step down).

People who attended the game stated that, in contrast with standard procedures, no security searches were conducted at the stadium entrances, allowing makeshift weapons to be smuggled in. Eyewitnesses claimed that the attending security personnel took no action to prevent or mitigate the clashes. There were other claims that the gates of the stadium were locked shut, trapping the minority Al-Ahly supporters inside.

Al-Ahly ultras claim that they were specifically targeted, given their vocal, highly televised calls for the SCAF to step down, as well as their open mockery of the previous regime and the SCAF. The ultras were one of the largest organized bodies of resistance in street protests after the absence of the Muslim Brotherhood following parliamentary elections.

Trials
Seventy-three defendants, including nine police officers and two officials from Port Said's Al-Masry club, were charged in the killing of 72 Ahly football club fans. On 26 January 2013, Port Said Criminal Court, convening at the Police Academy in New Cairo for security reasons, issued preliminary death sentences to 21 defendants. A verdict against the other 52 defendants was postponed to 9 March 2013. There was an outburst of emotion from the defendants' families when the judge announced the preliminary death sentences, requiring him to ask for an order in the court several times. Some parents fainted from shock. The Ahly ultras celebrated the verdict by carrying out demonstrations praising the sentence in front of their club branch in Zamalek and demanding the conviction of officers who were involved in the disaster. They then moved their demonstration to the Ministry of Interior headquarters to assert their demands of prosecuting the officers, resulting in clashes with the police who shot tear gas to disperse the protestors.

The people of Port Said saw the verdict as a political decision rather than a fair trial. Several Port Said officials announced their condemnation on various TV channels. Some of the defendants' families and the Masry ultras gathered around the prison in Port Said, while others went to block the main Mohamed Ali Street leading to the Port Said Governorate headquarters. A third group blocked the gates of a major textile industrial complex that employs about 20,000 workers. Amid the death sentence protests in Port Said, clashes erupted between pro-defendants' protestors and security forces near Port Said General Prison which left as many as two police officers and 40 civilians killed, and over 250 were injured.

On 9 March 2013, the court confirmed the 21 death sentences issued on 26 January. Of the remaining 52 defendants, five received life sentences, and ten received 15-year sentences, including two police officers, the former Port Said security director Essam Samak and the head of the Port Said water bodies security department, Mohamed Saad. Six defendants received 10-year sentences, two received 5-year sentences, and one received a 1-year sentence. The remaining 28 defendants were acquitted, including the other seven police officers charged. They included the former head of the Port Said police investigation department, Mostafa Razaz, the former head of the Central Security Forces in the Suez Canal area, Abdel-Aziz Sami, and the former head of Port Said national security directorate, Bahy El-Din Zaghloul. The other four police officers were all aides to these senior officials. Also acquitted are the only two officials from Port Said's Al-Masry club who were charged – Major General Mohsen Sheta, who was executive director of Al-Masry club at the time of the events, and former head of security at the club Mohamed El-Desouki.

Both the defendants and the prosecution appealed the verdicts. On 6 February 2014, Egypt's Court of Cassation ordered the retrial of 64 defendants and rejected the appeals of nine defendants sentenced to between 1 and 10 years in prison. On 19 April 2015, 11 defendants were issued preliminary death sentences in the retrial. The court postponed the verdict on the remaining 53 defendants. On 9 June 2015, the court confirmed the 11 death sentences and acquitted 21 defendants. Of the remaining 32 defendants, ten received 15-year sentences, nine received 10-year sentences, and thirteen received 5-year sentences, including the two police officers initially sentenced to 15 years in prison, and one official from Port Said's Al-Masry club, Mohsen Sheta, who was previously acquitted. On 23 August 2015, the court upheld a death sentence issued in absentia to 1 defendant and acquitted 5 of 6 other defendants sentenced in absentia to 10-year prison terms. The remaining defendant had his 10-year sentence issued in absentia reduced to 5 years on 15 November 2015. On 20 February 2017, Egypt's Court of Cassation upheld final death sentences for 11 issued in 2015.

See also

 2009 Egypt–Algeria World Cup Cairo clashes
 Football hooliganism
 Politics and sports

References

Egyptian revolution of 2011
2012–13 in Egyptian football
2012 riots
Al-Masry SC matches
Al Ahly SC matches
Association football hooliganism
Human stampedes in 2012
Port Said
Riots and civil disorder in Egypt
Association football riots
Stadium disasters
Egyptian Crisis (2011–2014)
February 2012 events in Africa
Man-made disasters in Egypt
Massacres in 2012
Massacres in Egypt
2012 disasters in Egypt